Bonner-West Riverside (Salish: Nʔaycčstm, "Place of the Big Bull Trout") is a census-designated place (CDP) in Missoula County, Montana, United States, including the  unincorporated communities of Bonner, Milltown (formerly Riverside), West Riverside, and Pinegrove. It is part of the Missoula, Montana Metropolitan Statistical Area. The population was 1,663 at the 2010 census, a decline from its population of 1,693 in 2000.

Bonner was named for Edward L. Bonner, president of the Missoula and Bitter Root Valley Railroad. Bonner was also a partner in Eddy, Hammond & Company, who were contracted by Northern Pacific Railroad for lumber to build their railway between the Thompson and Blackfoot rivers. Eddy, Hammond & Company founded the Montana Improvement Company, which built a sawmill in Bonner in 1886.

Milltown is named for the mill. West Riverside is named for its position west of Milltown, formerly called Riverside for its position at the confluence of the Blackfoot and Clark Fork Rivers. Pinegrove was named either for the Pine family that settled there or for the many large pines in the area. The associated Piltzville was named for Billy Piltz, early mill worker and yard boss.

Geography
Bonner-West Riverside is located at  (46.877718, -113.888915), on the Blackfoot River.

Climate
This climatic region is typified by large seasonal temperature differences, with warm to hot (and often humid) summers and cold (sometimes severely cold) winters.  According to the Köppen Climate Classification system, Bonner-West Riverside has a humid continental climate, abbreviated "Dfb" on climate maps.

Economy 
The area east of Missoula was born with the sawmill located there by Andrew B. Hammond. Hammond, with partners Richard Eddy and Edward Bonner, founders of the Montana Improvement Company (MIC), enticed the nearly complete Northern Pacific Railroad (NP) to pass through Missoula. They were rewarded with lucrative NP lumber contracts. Hammond, on behalf of the MIC, purchased land east of Missoula on Blackfoot River for a sawmill and dam to hold the mill's supply of logs. The Blackfoot Milling Company began operation on 6 June 1886 and by August produced an average of 55,000 board feet of lumber per day. In addition to the NP contracts, the Blackfoot Mill (or Hammond Mill) provided stulls (mining shaft supports) and lumber for construction. It continued to expand and in 1889 it produced 24 million board feet of lumber and was considered the largest mill between Wisconsin and the West Coast. The sawmill was purchased by the Anaconda Company in 1898.

Bonner was the company town, encompassing the mill plus housing for mill managers and supervisors and a company store. By 1888, it included a post office, and in 1889 Bonner Hall, which housed the Masonic Lodge and the first school. In 1892, the elegant Margaret Hotel was built to house dignitaries. Later, a school, two churches, a library and community gardens were added. Only mill employees lived there. When the mill changed hands, Bonner with all its buildings was included. Bonner remained a possession of the mill until finally sold to private ownership in 2007.

Milltown, originally called Riverside, was organized a half mile downstream. John McCormick leased small lots of his "farmland" to mill workers and loggers who constructed small dwellings with materials "borrowed" from the mill. By 1892, Riverside already had a dozen homes, a livery stable, boarding house, and three saloons. In 1903, the anticipated construction of the new dam brought more workers who leased land. No one owned the land their homes were on until decades later.

In 1910, West Riverside was platted across the Blackfoot from Riverside, allowing for private land ownership. Population increased there with the establishment of the Western Lumber Company. Farming and more private homes became available to the east in Piltzville and to the west in Pine Grove.

"On January 16, 1919, the 'greatest fire in the history of Western Montana' burned a large portion of the mill to the ground." The mill was rebuilt and operational again by September, 1919. Through the 1970s and 1980s, the Bonner Mill was thought to be the world's largest of its type. The Anaconda Company sold the mill to US Plywood-Champion Papers in 1972. It was sold to Stimson Lumber Company in 1993, and was closed in 2008, after "122 years of continuous lumber production". In 2011, a heavy snowfall collapsed much of the mill's roof. The last PCBs were removed from the site in 2016.

Bonner Dam was built in 1884 (rebuilt in 1886) on the Blackfoot River to hold logs and provide a little energy to the mill. Milltown Dam (aka Clark’s dam), finished in January 1908, was built just passed the confluence of the Blackfoot and Clark Fork Rivers by Montana’s U.S Senator William A. Clark to supply hydroelectricity to local mills and the city of Missoula. The largest flood ever seen on those rivers occurred six months later, depositing millions of cubic yards of silt laden with heavy metals and arsenic in the Milltown Reservoir from upriver mining sites. As part of a Superfund cleanup site, Bonner Dam was removed in 2005 and Milltown Dam was removed in 2008. The Superfund restoration plan includes a redevelopment effort aimed at economic development and community revitalization.

Demographics

As of the census of 2010, there were 1,663 people, 690 households, and 460 families residing in the CDP. The population density was 1,091.6 people per square mile (421.7/km2). There were 723 housing units at an average density of 466.2 per square mile (180.1/km2). The racial makeup of the CDP was 94.39% White, 0.24% African American, 2.36% Native American, 0.06% Asian, 0.59% from other races, and 2.36% from two or more races. Hispanic or Latino of any race were 1.71% of the population.

There were 690 households, out of which 33.2% had children under the age of 18 living with them, 49.3% were married couples living together, 11.2% had a female householder with no husband present, and 33.2% were non-families. 25.1% of all households were made up of individuals, and 6.8% had someone living alone who was 65 years of age or older. The average household size was 2.45 and the average family size was 2.93.

In the CDP, the population was spread out, with 25.9% under the age of 18, 12.8% from 18 to 24, 31.7% from 25 to 44, 21.4% from 45 to 64, and 8.2% who were 65 years of age or older. The median age was 32 years. For every 100 females there were 104.0 males. For every 100 females age 18 and over, there were 102.7 males.

The median income for a household in the CDP was $32,557, and the median income for a family was $37,206. Males had a median income of $28,417 versus $25,403 for females. The per capita income for the CDP was $15,652. About 8.3% of families and 10.9% of the population were below the poverty line, including 10.6% of those under age 18 and 9.1% of those age 65 or over.

References

Further reading 
 A Grass Roots Tribute: The Story of Bonner, Montana. Missoula, MT : Big Sky Composition, 2008.

External links 

Census-designated places in Missoula County, Montana